Liocranoeca is a genus of liocranid sac spiders that was first described by J. Wunderlich in 1999.<ref name=Wund1999>{{cite journal| last=Wunderlich| first=J.| year=1999| title=Liocranoeca-eine bisher unbekannte Gattung der Feldspinnen aus Europa und Nordamerika (Arachnida: Araneae: Liocranidae)| journal=Entomologische Zeitschrift, Frankfurt a.M| pages=67–70| volume=109}}</ref>

Species
 it contains four species, found in Europe, Siberia, and the United States:Liocranoeca emertoni (Kaston, 1938) – USALiocranoeca spasskyi Ponomarev, 2007 – Ukraine, Russia (Europe)Liocranoeca striata (Kulczyński, 1882) (type) – Europe, Russia (Europe to South Siberia)Liocranoeca vjosensis'' Komnenov, 2018 – Albania

See also
 List of Liocranidae species

References

Araneomorphae genera
Liocranidae
Spiders of Russia
Spiders of the United States